The Kitoy is a river in Buryatia and Irkutsk Oblast in Russia, a left tributary of the Angara. The length of the river is 316 km. The area of its basin is 9,190 km². The Kitoy freezes up in the second half of October and stays icebound until late April through early May. The city of Angarsk is located on the Kitoy.

References

Rivers of Irkutsk Oblast
Rivers of Buryatia